Banatić is an urban neighborhood of the city of Novi Sad, Serbia. Its name means "a little Banat".

Borders
The southern border of Banatić is Bulevar kralja Petra I (King Petar I Boulevard), the eastern border is Bulevar oslobođenja (Liberation Boulevard), the north-eastern borders are Bulevar Jaše Tomića (Jaša Tomić Boulevard) and Kisačka ulica (Kisač street), the northern border is railway Belgrade-Subotica, the north-western border is ulica Kornelija Stankovića (Kornelije Stanković Street), and the western border is Rumenačka ulica (Rumenka Street).

Neighbouring city quarters

The neighbouring city quarters are: Detelinara in the west, Sajmište in the south, Rotkvarija and Salajka in the east, and Pervazovo Naselje and Industrijska Zona Jug in the north.

Features
The city main train and bus stations are located in Banatić.

Gallery

See also
 Neighborhoods of Novi Sad

References

Jovan Mirosavljević, Brevijar ulica Novog Sada 1745-2001, Novi Sad, 2002.
Milorad Grujić, Vodič kroz Novi Sad i okolinu, Novi Sad, 2004.

External links

Detailed map of Novi Sad and Banatić
Map

Novi Sad neighborhoods